European route E 583 is a European B-class road connecting the city of Roman in Romania with Zhytomyr in Ukraine, via Moldova.

Route 
 
 : Roman (E85) – Săbăoani
 : Săbăoani – Târgu Frumos (Start of concurrency with E58) – Iași
 : Iași – Sculeni
 
 : Sculeni (End of concurrency with E58) – Răuțel
 : Răuțel – Bălți – Edineț
 : Edineț – Otaci
 
 : Mohyliv-Podilskyi – Vinnytsia (E50) – Berdychiv – Zhytomyr (E40)

External links 
 UN Economic Commission for Europe: Overall Map of E-road Network (2007)
 International E-road network

Roads in Romania
Roads in Moldova
European routes in Ukraine